Scoriodyta sereinae is a moth of the Psychidae family. It was described by Haettenschwiler in 1989. It is found in New Zealand.

References

 Scoriodyta sereinae in species id

Moths described in 1989
Moths of New Zealand
Psychidae